Amor de Perdição is a 1978 Portuguese film directed by Manoel de Oliveira. Amor de Perdição is conceived as a succession of "live images" shot with a camera, in still shots, mostly in studio décor, with few outside views.  The image composition is quite careful, in keeping with such deliberate artificialism, sometimes with expressionistic traits.

Cast
 António Sequeira Lopes
 Cristina Hauser
 Elsa Wellenkamp

References

External links
 

1978 romantic drama films
Amor de Perdição
Films based on Portuguese novels
Films directed by Manoel de Oliveira
Films produced by Paulo Branco
Films set in Portugal
Portuguese romantic drama films
1978 films
1970s Portuguese-language films